The Fah River is a river in Eritrea that flows into the Red Sea.

Rivers of Eritrea